Eric G. Phillips is the founder and CEO of Phillips Enterprises, LLC, a national investment vehicle and the founder and CEO of Phillips Acquisitions, LLC, a national real estate acquisition company specializing in student housing. He is also the founder and CEO of Phillips Property Management, LLC, a real estate property management company specializing in student housing. Currently Phillips owns and operates 2,200+ student housing beds across the US.

Phillips was also the founder and President of First Phillips, Inc., a Virginia-based real estate investment and management company, which he sold at the peak of the real estate market in 2006. He owned and managed 7,500 student housing beds.

Phillips has over 30 years’ experience in real estate acquisitions, investments and management. He was a pioneer in the student housing industry well before its current popularity to include 12-month leases and renting by the bed. Prior to starting his companies, Phillips joined Banc One as VP of the Commercial Real Estate Division and was in charge of the liquidation of a diverse commercial real estate portfolio in New England, New York, Pennsylvania, Florida, and Texas.

Phillips serves and/or supports many non-profits.

Phillips served as Treasurer and Secretary on the Lorton Arts Foundation's board of directors. The Lorton Arts Center is a cultural arts center in a historical former correctional facility, which today provides Fairfax County, Lorton, Virginia with ongoing programs for the visual and performing arts and has over 100 onsite working artists.

He is currently serving on The Granada Theatre/Santa Barbara Center for The Performing Arts, Inc. board of directors in Santa Barbara, CA. He sits on the Board, the Executive Board, as Vice President, and on the Finance Committee. The Granada provides a world-class venue for the performing arts.

He is also currently serving on the Santa Barbara Police Foundation Board. The Foundation supports the Santa Barbara Police Department by raising community awareness and providing needed funds for officers injured or killed in the line of duty; help for the department and/or family members who suffer catastrophic illness; and to purchase necessary equipment not provided in the department budget.

Phillips is also a board member for the Santa Barbara International Film Festival and sits on the Strategic Planning Committee.

In addition, Phillips is also on the Advisory Board for the United Boys & Girls Clubs of Santa Barbara County. United B&G is committed to enable all young people, especially those who need us most, to reach their full potential as productive, caring and responsible citizens.

Phillips was born and raised in California. He received a BA from the University of Texas at Austin. He resides in Montecito with his wife, Nina. They have three grown children: Ariana, Michael and Robert.

References

American chief executives of financial services companies
University of Texas at Austin alumni
Living people
People from Lorton, Virginia
People from Montecito, California
Year of birth missing (living people)